Wellington (originally City of Wellington), was a parliamentary electorate in Wellington, New Zealand. It existed from 1853 to 1905 with a break in the 1880s. It was a multi-member electorate. The electorate was represented, over the years, by 24 members of parliament.

Population centres
In December 1887, the House of Representatives voted to reduce its membership from general electorates from 91 to 70. The 1890 electoral redistribution used the same 1886 census data used for the 1887 electoral redistribution. In addition, three-member electorates were introduced in the four main centres. This resulted in a major restructuring of electorates, and Wellington was one of eight electorates to be re-created for the 1890 election.

History
The electorate was one of the original electorates used in the 1853 election for the 1st New Zealand Parliament. During the period until 1871, Wellington was a three-member electorate.

In 1858, Isaac Featherston and William Fitzherbert resigned their seats in Parliament. Featherston apparently wanted to return to England. Instead, he successfully stood for re-election within months. The other person returned in the same by-election was William Barnard Rhodes.

The election for the 3rd Parliament was held on 11 December 1860, with the announcement of the official results on 15 December.

Members of Parliament

Key

Three-member electorate (1853–1871)

Two-member electorate (1871–1881)

Three-member electorate (1890–1905)

Election results

1905 by-election

1902 election

 
 
 

1 Majority is difference between lowest winning poll (Fisher: 6,685) and highest losing poll (O'Regan: 6,304)

1899 election

 
 
 

1 Majority is difference between lowest winning poll (Fisher: 6,442) and highest losing poll (Macdonald: 6,320)

1899 by-election

1898 by-election

1896 election

 
 
 
 
 
 
 
 
 
 

1 Majority is difference between lowest winning poll (Fisher: 5,858) and highest losing poll (Atkinson: 5,830)

2 Turnout is total number of voters – as voters had three votes each total votes cast was higher (37,618)

1893 election

 
 
 

1893 was the first election in which women could vote (the electoral act giving women the vote was passed ten weeks prior to the election). Electoral returns quantified female enrolment and turnout, and showed women's turnout was higher than men's while women's enrolment was lower.

1 Majority is difference between lowest winning poll (Duthie – 4,840) and highest losing poll (Mcdonald – 3,863)

2 Turnout is total number of voters – as voters had three votes each total votes cast was higher (36,102 valid, and 147 invalid votes)

1892 by-election

1890 election

1878 by-election

1877 by-election

1858 by-election

1855 election

 
 
 
 
 
 
 

Table footnotes
<noinclude>

Notes

References

Historical electorates of New Zealand
Politics of the Wellington Region
1853 establishments in New Zealand
1905 disestablishments in New Zealand
1890 establishments in New Zealand
1881 disestablishments in New Zealand